Netherlands competed at the 2000 Summer Paralympics in Sydney, Australia. The team included 102 athletes, 69 men and 33 women. Competitors from Netherlands won 30 medals, including 12 gold, 9 silver and 9 bronze to finish 15th in the medal table.

Medalists

Source: www.paralympic.org & www.olympischstadion.nl

See also
Netherlands at the Paralympics
Netherlands at the 2000 Summer Olympics

References 

Nations at the 2000 Summer Paralympics
2000
Summer Paralympics